Edith Cook may refer to:

 Edith Agnes Cook (1859–1942), Australian educator
 Edith Maud Cook (1878–1910), British parachutist, balloonist, and aviator